Cuello is a Spanish surname. Notable people with the surname include:

Claudio Cuello (born 1958), Argentine volleyball player and coach
Denver Cuello (born 1986), Filipino boxer
Emil Cuello (born 1997), Argentine and American footballer
Federico Cuello Camilo (born 1966), Dominican Republic diplomat
Luciano Leonel Cuello (born 1984), Argentine boxer
Miguel Ángel Cuello (1946–1999), Argentine boxer
Román Cuello (born 1977), Uruguayan footballer
Tomás Cuello (born 2000), Argentine footballer

Spanish-language surnames